This is a list of French television related events from 2005.

Events
15 March - Ortal is selected to represent France at the 2005 Eurovision Song Contest with her song "Chacun pense à soi". She is selected to be the forty-eighth French Eurovision entry during a national final held at the La Plaine-St-Denis Studios in Paris.
31 March - France 4 starts broadcasting.
12 May - Myriam Abel wins the third series of Nouvelle Star, becoming the show's first female winner.
16 December - Magalie Vaé wins the fifth series of Star Academy.

Debuts
22 October - 5, Rue Sésame (2005-2007)
24 December- Yakari

Television shows

1940s
Le Jour du Seigneur (1949–present)

1950s
Présence protestante (1955-)

1970s
30 millions d'amis (1976-2016)

1990s
Sous le soleil (1996-2008)

2000s
Star Academy (2001-2008, 2012-2013)
Nouvelle Star (2003-2010, 2012–present)
Plus belle la vie (2004–present)

Ending this year

Births

Deaths

See also
2005 in France